Volonga is a rural locality (a settlement) in Semigorodneye Rural Settlement, Kharovsky District, Vologda Oblast, Russia. The population was 61 as of 2002.

Geography 
Volonga is located 42 km south of Kharovsk (the district's administrative centre) by road. Vozrozhdeniye is the nearest rural locality.

References 

Rural localities in Kharovsky District